Duhok is a city in the Kurdistan Region of Iraq. It's the capital city of Duhok Governorate.

History 

The city's origin dates back to the Stone Age. It became part of the Assyrian Empire, then the Babylonian Empire before it fell into the hands of Achaemenid Empire after the Fall of Babylon, and subsequently fell into the hands of Alexander the Great and the Romans. It became an important center of Syriac Christianity where it was known as "ܒܝܬ ܢܘܗܕܪܐ" Beth Nohdry, before fading out after the conquests of Mesopotamia by Tamerlane.

According to Evliya Çelebi, the city was initially called Dohuk-e Dasinya, named after the militant Dasini tribe who were believers of Yazidism. The Yazidi population is still relatively significant, but has decreased due to persecution. This made it possible for Muslims, Christians, and Jews to settle in the town.

The city became prominent in 1236, when Hasan Beg Saifadin joined the Bahdinan Principality. In 1842, the Principality was dissolved by the Ottomans. The region was administered from Mosul. In 1820, Claudius Rich described Dohuk as a small town of 300 houses and the principal settlement of the Kurdish Doski tribe, who also lived in eighty villages. In 1851, Henry Aaron Stern pointed at the heterogenous composition in the city and mentioned a Jewish presence. He also mentioned that the mayor was a Chaldean Catholic. In 1859, the city had two minyans according to Rabbi Yechiel.

In 1929, the city had a population of 3,500, of which a majority were Kurdish. Of the 550 families, 65 were Christian, and 30 were Jewish. The city also housed Tyari and Chaldean refugees from Turkey.

Modern times 
The University of Duhok was founded on 31 October 1992.

The city is home to diverse ethnic groups, including Iraqi Kurds who are the majority, while other minorities include Assyrians, Yazidis and Arabs. The city also hosts tens of thousands of internally displaced persons (IDPs), most of whom are Yazidis and Assyrian Christians after the Islamic State expansion in Iraq in 2014 and the subsequent Fall of Mosul and the Nineveh Plains region after two more months of fighting, in addition to the Sinjar massacre in which 5,000 Yezidis were massacred during the genocide of Yazidis by ISIL. According to the International Organization for Migration (IOM-Iraq), as of June 2019, Duhok Governorate hosted 326,106 IDPs across 169 different locations.

Archaeology 
In 2020, researchers discovered in the Balyuz hills, ten kilometers west of Duhok City, an ancient tablet with Greek inscription which dates back to 165 B.C. The inscriptions refer to Demetrius, the region's ruler during that time.

Seven kilometers southwest of Duhok, Halamata Cave is an archaeological site containing the Assyrian relief carvings known as the Maltai Reliefs, associated with the northern canal system built by the Assyrian king Sennacherib (r. 704-681 BCE) to carry water to his capital city of Nineveh".

Climate
According to the Köppen-Geiger climate classification system, Duhok, like most of Upper Mesopotamia, has a hot-summer Mediterranean climate (Csa) featuring sweltering, virtually rainless summers and cool to cold, wet winters. Precipitation falls in the cooler months, being heaviest in late winter and early spring. The city can get around two or three snowy days yearly, with more severe falls in the uplands. Summers are virtually rainless, with rain returning in late autumn.

Notable people
 

Sami Khoshaba Latchin, American of Iraqi-Assyrian descent

See also
List of largest cities in Iraq
Duhok International Airport
Assyrians in Iraq
Kurds in Iraq
Yazidis in Iraq

References

External links

Iraq Image - Dahuk Satellite Observation

 
Cities in Iraqi Kurdistan
District capitals of Iraq
Populated places in Dohuk Province
Assyrian communities in Iraq
Ancient Assyrian cities
Cities in Iraq
Kurdish settlements in Iraq
Historic Jewish communities in Iraq
Yazidi populated places in Iraq